Echeveria elegans, the Mexican snow ball, Mexican gem or white Mexican rose is a species of flowering plant in the family Crassulaceae, native to semi-desert habitats in Mexico.

Description

Cultivation
Echeveria elegans is cultivated as an ornamental plant for rock gardens planting, or as a potted plant. It thrives in subtropical climates, such as Southern California

It has gained the Royal Horticultural Society's Award of Garden Merit.

Like others of its kind, it produces multiple offsets which can be separated from the parents in spring, and grown separately - hence the common name "hen and chicks", applied to several species within the genus Echeveria.

Etymology
Echeveria is named for Atanasio Echeverría y Godoy, a botanical illustrator who contributed to Flora Mexicana.

Elegans means 'elegant' or 'graceful'.

References

Attila Kapitany, (2009). Knowing Echeverias, Cactus and Succulent Journal, Volume 81 Issue 2.

External links

Endemic flora of Mexico
Garden plants of North America
Drought-tolerant plants
elegans
Plants described in 1903